Golden Gate Airlines was a United States regional airline founded in 1980 in Monterey, California after the merger of Gem State Airlines and Air Pacific (USA) in 1979.  It merged again in 1981, this time with Swift Aire Lines, but discontinued service shortly thereafter and then went out of business.

Cities served

Golden Gate Airlines served the following destinations during its existence.  In July 1981 Golden Gate Airlines and merger partner Swift Aire Lines were serving a number of destinations either separately or jointly together.
 Bakersfield, California (BFL) – served by Golden Gate and Swift Aire
 Boise, Idaho (BOI)
 Elko, Nevada (EKO)
 Ely, Nevada (ELY)
 Fresno, California (FAT)
 Grand Junction, Colorado (GJT)
Lake Tahoe, California (TVL)
Las Vegas, Nevada (LAS)
 Los Angeles, California (LAX) – Hub  - served by Golden Gate and Swift Aire
 Merced, California (MCE)
 Modesto, California (MOD)
 Monterey, California (MRY) – Golden Gate Airlines home base
 Oxnard, California (OXR)
Oakland, California (OAK)
 Palm Springs, California (PSP) – served by Swift Aire
 Pendleton, Oregon (PDT) 
 Reno, Nevada (RNO)
 Sacramento, California (SMF) 
 Salt Lake City, Utah (SLC) - Hub
 San Francisco, California (SFO) – Hub - served by Golden Gate and Swift Aire
 San Diego, California (SAN) – served by Swift Aire
 San Jose, California (SJC) – served by Golden Gate and Swift Aire
 San Luis Obispo, California (SBP) – served by Swift Aire
 Santa Barbara, California (SBA) – served by Swift Aire
 Santa Maria, California (SMX) – served by Swift Aire
 Stockton, California (SCK)
 Sun Valley, Idaho (SUN)

Fleet 

Following the merger of Golden Gate Airlines and Swift Aire, the following turboprop aircraft types were being operated by the combined air carriers:

de Havilland Canada DHC-7 Dash 7
 Convair 580
Fairchild Swearingen Metroliner
Aérospatiale N 262 (Nord 262) (via merger with Swift Aire Lines)
 Fokker F27 Friendship (via merger with Swift Aire Lines)

See also 
 List of defunct airlines of the United States

References

Defunct airlines of the United States
Airlines established in 1980
Airlines disestablished in 1981
1980 establishments in California
1981 disestablishments in California